Therese Peche (1806–1882), was a German-born Austrian stage actor.

She was engaged at the Burgtheater in Vienna between 1830 and 1867. She was a leading elite member of the theatre. For many years, she was known for playing the heroine in famous classical plays of Shakespeare. During her last years on stage, she played aristocratic ladies.

The Pechegasse in Vienna was named after her in 1930.

References 

1806 births
1882 deaths
19th-century Austrian actresses